The Fire Museum of Maryland, founded in 1971, is located in Lutherville, Maryland near Baltimore, Maryland. With a collection of over forty pieces of firefighting apparatus, the Fire Museum of Maryland explains and interprets the history of the urban fire service in the U.S. for visitors and through school programming. The museum began as the private collection of the Stephen G. Heaver family collected over forty years.

The museum holds an annual "Lantern Night" program where museum docents and staff tell stories from the Battle of Baltimore and the War of 1812 while dressed in period clothing.

References

External links 
 
 Fire Museum of Maryland – Explore Baltimore Heritage

Firefighting museums in the United States
History museums in Maryland
Museums in Baltimore County, Maryland
Museums established in 1971
1971 establishments in Maryland
Firefighting in Maryland